Slover is a surname. Notable people with the surname include:

Isaac Slover (1780–1854), American fur trader
Karl Slover (1918–2011), Slovakian-born American actor 
Tim Slover, American playwright and professor of theatre studies